France–India relations are the bilateral relations between France and India, two countries that have traditionally been close and friendly. Both countries have a 'special relationship' with each other, so much so that by August 2019, France has been called "India's new best friend"  by a researcher of the Hudson Institute. Both nations have a centuries-old history of trade relations. From the 17th century until 1954, France maintained a colonial presence in the Indian subcontinent; Puducherry, one of its former Indian territories, is a popular tourism destination for French travellers to India.

With the establishment of the strategic partnership in 1998, there has been significant progress in all areas of bilateral cooperation through regular high-level exchanges at the Head of State/Head of Government levels and growing commercial exchanges including in strategic areas such as defence, nuclear energy and space. France was the first country with which India entered into an agreement on nuclear energy following the waiver given by the International Atomic Energy Agency and the Nuclear Suppliers’ Group, enabling India to resume full civil nuclear cooperation with the international community. There is also a growing and wide-ranging cooperation in areas such as trade and investment, culture, science and technology and education. France has consistently supported India's goals for a multipolar world, led by regional democracies.

History

An Indian Christian priest, Saint Severus settled in Vienne, France in the 5th century. In the 17th century François Bernier (1625–1688), a French physician and traveler, became for 12 years the personal physician of the Mughal emperor Aurangzeb.

In the 18th century, France was actively involved in the European colonial powerplay in the Indian Ocean region.

The French General Dupleix was allied to Murzapha Jung in the Deccan, and Chanda Sahib in the Carnatic Wars, in the conflict against Robert Clive of the East India Company. These relationships were beneficial to the French, and French allies gifted areas such as the Alamparai Fort in return for the services provided by the French against the British East India Company.

The French succeeded in the 1746 Battle of Madras, and the French and Indians fought together and vanquished Anwaruddin in 1749, but failed in the Battle of Arcot in 1751 and finally surrendered in 1752. The French again had a success at the capture of Fort St David in 1758 under Lally, but were finally defeated at Machilipatnam (1759) and Vandavasi (1760).

The French military adventurer and mercenary, Benoît de Boigne, made his name in India under the Marathas, whom he assisted in many battles against the Rajputs.

French had lost pre-eminence in India with the Treaty of Paris (1763), although five trading posts were being maintained there, leaving opportunities for disputes and power-play with the British. France was successful in supporting the Patriot cause during American War of Independence in 1776, and wished to expel the British from India as well.

In 1782, Louis XVI sealed an alliance with the Maratha Peshwa Madhav Rao Narayan. As a consequence Bussy moved his troops to Ile de France (Mauritius) and later contributed to the French effort in India in 1783. Admiral Suffren became the ally of Hyder Ali in the Second Anglo-Mysore War against the British East India Company in 1782–1783, engaging in five battles against the Royal Navy on the coasts of India and Ceylon. Between February 1782 until June 1783, Suffren fought the English admiral Sir Edward Hughes, and collaborated with the rulers of Mysore. An army of 3,000 French soldiers collaborated with Hyder Ali to capture Cuddalore.

While the British established their authority over the Madras Presidency (covering the modern Indian states of Andhra Pradesh and Tamil Nadu), France retained control of Pondicherry, Karikal, Yanam, and Mahé, as well as maintaining a foothold in Chandannagar, now in West Bengal. During the British Raj, many Indian independence activists (Subramania Bharati, Lala Lajpat Rai, Sri Aurobindo) sought refuge in French establishments in India to stay out of reach of the British colonial authorities.

Sikh-French Relations 
Maharaja Ranjit Singh had more than 2000 French soldiers in his military. Three became generals and were key in the modernization of the Khalsa Army. He also hired many Italian, American, Spanish and Prussian soldiers. The Fauj-i-Khas was also known as the French division of the army and had French battle standard with its tricolor and eagle. The men who spearheaded the Europeanization of the army was Jean Francois Allard and Jean-Baptiste Ventura. Even now a bust of Maharaja Ranjit Singh is in Saint-Tropez, France.

India in World War I and World War II 

Indian Expeditionary Force A, Indian Army Service Corps and Imperial Service Troops contributed to defend France during World War I and World War II.

Darwan Singh Negi, Gabar Singh Negi, Gobind Singh Rathore and Mir Dast were awarded the Victoria Cross for exceptional gallantry on French battlefields. Flight Lieutenant Hardit Singh Malik of No. 28 Squadron RFC flew a Sopwith Camel over France during WWI.

Some of the more prominent battles involving troops from the India:
 Battle of Neuve Chapelle
 Battle of Armentières
 First Battle of Ypres
 Battle of the Somme
 Battle of Loos
 Battle of Bazentin
 Battle of La Bassée
 Battle of Flers-Courcelette
 Battle of Festubert
 Battle of Aubers Ridge
 Battle of Cambrai
 the advance to the Hindenburg Line
 First Battle of Champagne

India suffered the greatest World War I casualties amongst dominions, colonies, protectorates, mandates and other territories of the British Empire. It is estimated that between 64,449 and 73,895 Indians died in Europe during the First World War (compared to between 59,330 and 62,081 Australians and between 58,639 and 64,997 Canadians).

Of the 130,000 Indians who served in Somme and Flanders theatre of operations during World War One, almost 9,000 died. According to the Commonwealth War Graves Commission, 8128 graves of soldiers of the Indian Army and porters of the Indian Labour Corps who perished in WWI and WWII are located in France.

Marshal Ferdinand Foch, the French Commander at the Battle of Neuve Chapelle (4,200 Indian casualties), acknowledged the contribution of troops from India and said: "Return to your homes in the distant, sun-bathed East and proclaim how your countrymen drenched with their blood the cold northern land of France and Flanders, how they delivered it by their ardent spirit from the firm grip of a determined enemy; tell all India that we shall watch over their graves with the devotion due to all our dead. We shall cherish above all the memory of their example. They showed us the way, they made the first steps towards the final victory."

Due to Hindu funeral rites – where mortal remains are cremated – most Indian casualties are commemorated with inscriptions on war memorials at Neuve-Chapelle Indian Memorial and the Anneau de la Mémoire of Notre Dame de Lorette Ablain St.-Nazaire French Military Cemetery rather than with individual graves. Ayette Indian and Chinese Cemetery, La Chapelette British and Indian Cemetery, Neuville-Sous-Montreuil Indian Cemetery, Gorre British and Indian Cemetery, Zelobes Indian Cemetery, Étaples Military Cemetery, Saint-Martin-lès-Boulogne Meerut Military Cemetery, Cabaret-Rouge British Cemetery, Béthune Town Cemetery, Arques-la-Bataille British Cemetery and Mazargues War Cemetery, Marseilles are examples of military cemeteries which contain graves or memorials to Indian casualties in France. Dieppe Canadian War Cemetery contains the grave of Pilot Officer Dastur Rustom Nariman of the Royal Indian Air Force 12 Sqdn.(R.A.F.). Colonial troops and labourers, including those from the Indian Subcontinent, are collectively identified as lascars in French military necropolis as can be observed at Notre Dame de Lorette Ablain St.-Nazaire French Military Cemetery.

A small number of Indians from French India, notably from Chandannagar, served as colonial infantrymen in the French Army during World War I. The Monument aux Morts in Pondicherry was built in memory of colonial troops from French India. Pondicherry responded to the June 1940 appeal by Charles de Gaulle and became the first French territory to abandon the collaborationist Vichy regime and join Free France.

Cession of French territories in India

France established diplomatic relations with the newly independent India in 1947. An agreement between France and India in 1948 stipulated that the inhabitants of France's Indian possessions would choose their political future. A treaty of cession was signed by the two countries in May 1956. It was ratified by the French parliament in May 1962. On 16 August 1962 India and France exchanged the instruments of ratification under which France ceded to India full sovereignty over the territories it held. Pondicherry and the other enclaves of Karaikal, Mahe and Yanam came to be administered as the Union Territory of Puducherry from 1 July 1963.

The merits and deficiencies of French colonial presence in India is disputed on accounts of the exploitative nature of colonial trade, segregation of French subjects within the colonial possessions along ethnic lines (Europeans and Creoles were differentiated from ethnic Indians on electoral lists) and the colonial use of indenture labour.

Development of bilateral relations

The bilateral relations with France, although globally positive, fluctuated in function of defence sales to Pakistan (Exocet missiles, Dassault Mirage III, Dassault Mirage 5 & Breguet Atlantic aircraft and Daphné-class & Agosta 90B-class submarines) and were offset by especially strong relations in the fields of civil nuclear energy and aerospace.

Visits by Head of State and Head of Government 
A key milestone in the bilateral relationship was the visit in 1998 by President Jacques Chirac. The visit elevated the relationship through the signing of India's first ever strategic partnership.

In January 2008, President Nicolas Sarkozy visited India and was the chief guest at India's Republic Day parade.

In September 2008, Indian Prime Minister Manmohan Singh made a major visit to France.

On 14 July 2009, Prime Minister of India Manmohan Singh was the Guest of Honour for the Bastille Day Celebrations held in Paris. The 2009 Bastille Day military parade opened with a contingent of Indian troops drawn from the three services (Indian Army, Indian Navy and Indian Air Force). Soldiers including Jawans of Maratha Light Infantry Regiment Centre (MLIRC) marched down the Avenue Champs-Élysées to the sound of an Indian military band playing Indian martial tunes including Saare Jahan Se Achcha, Haste Lushai and Kadam Kadam Badaye Ja.

French President Sarkozy undertook his second visit to India from 4–7 December 2010.

French President Francois Hollande visited India on 14–15 February 2013.

Indian Prime-Minister Narendra Modi was in Paris on 10–11 April 2015 for strategic bilateral discussions with French President François Hollande. A joint status report established the current state of the bilateral relationship and plans for the future through the April 2015 India-France joint statement.

On 30 November 2015, Indian Prime-Minister Narendra Modi travelled to France for a 2-day visit to attend the COP 21 2015 United Nations Climate Change Conference in Paris. Narendra Modi and François Hollande jointly invited over 100 world leaders to join InSPA (International Agency for Solar Policy & Application) – a global initiative to promote low-carbon renewable solar energy technologies.

January 2016 visit by French President François Hollande 

A French delegation headed by President François Hollande and including several French cabinet ministers (foreign minister Laurent Fabius, defence minister Jean-Yves Le Drian, finance minister Michel Sapin, culture minister Fleur Pellerin and environment minister Segolene Royal) travelled to India on 24 January 2016 for a 3-day visit.

Speaking at the Indo-French CEOs Forum and the India France Business Summit in Chandigarh on 24 January 2016, President François Hollande set the tone for the visit by stating his intentions: "My visit has 2 main goals – Consolidate the strategic partnership with India and implement decisions taken during Prime Minister Narendra Modi's visit to France". Indian Prime Minister Narendra Modi reciprocated by declaring that "India and France are made for each other" (...) "The trust and friendship with France is an asset for us" and by emphasising the need to consolidate people-to-people ties between India & France: "Our strategic partnership is not just between Paris and New Delhi. It is with each and every one of you".

French President François Hollande was the chief guest at the 67th. Indian Republic Day parade in New Delhi on 26 January 2016. France,along with Britain are the only countries to be invited a record-setting 5 times to the highly symbolic national ceremonial event. The 2016 Indian Republic Day parade included the first-ever participation of foreign troops in the march-past. 124 French Army soldiers from the 35th. Infantry Regiment of the 7th. Armoured Brigade based in Belfort and a ceremonial military band-music contingent based in Lyon marched down Rajpath in New Delhi.

The visit gained favourable media coverage which underscored the consistently cordial and exceptional nature of Indo-French bilateral relations and decoded the political significance of the protocol courtesies extended to France. Leading Indian newspapers published editorials lauding successful bilateral cooperation in the domains of science and technology, aerospace, nuclear energy, defence and counter-terrorism. Kanwal Sibal, the former Foreign Secretary of India and who had also been India's Ambassador to France opined: "He (President Hollande) recognises the esteem India has for France and the growing affinity between the two countries." (...) "Hollande attaches value to the personal rapport he has developed with Modi, recognises the dynamism he is imparting to the Indian economy and believes in the growing affinity between the two countries. On this basis the Indo-French strategic ties should grow in strength."

March 2018 visit by French President Emmanuel Macron 
Indian Prime Minister Narendra Modi received the French President Emmanuel Macron. The two counterparts discussed the French-Indian relations over the years and signed multiple agreements. Modi commented that although the strategic partnership between the two countries is "just 20 years old, our cultural and spiritual partnership is older. The values of liberty, equality, and fraternity echo not just in France but have been embedded in India’s Constitution as well." Macron told the media, "We want India as our first strategic partner here, and we want to be India’s first strategic partner in Europe, and even the western world."

In August 2019, Aparna Pande, Research fellow at the Hudson Institute, penned an article claiming that France had become India's new best friend, replacing Russia as India's closest international partner.

Strategic partnership

The strategic partnership has profited from sustained political investments made at the senior-most levels of decision making. The long-standing relationship between France and India has resulted in extensive co-operation in the domains of aerospace and civil nuclear energy besides military matters. Science and technology cooperation, deep-rooted cultural ties, and a historically francophile literary & fine-arts community in India has provided solid foundations for the strategic relationship. In November 2011, the Foundation for National Security Research in New Delhi published India’s Strategic Partners: A Comparative Assessment and ranked India's top strategic partners with a score out of 90 points : Russia comes out on top with 62, followed by the United States (58), France (51), UK (41), Germany (37), and Japan (34).

Voting patterns of France in the UN Security Council on matters of core interest to India has endeared the country as all-weather friend of India. France was one of the few nations who did not condemn India's nuclear tests in 1998 and has supported India's bid to become a permanent member of the UN Security Council as well as G-8. France is one of the largest suppliers of nuclear fuel to India, and signed a "Framework Agreement for Civil Nuclear Co-operation" in January 2008. After India's waiver from the Nuclear Suppliers Group (NSG), both nations signed an agreement that would pave the way for the sale of French-made nuclear reactors to India on 30 September 2008. France is a major supplier of military equipment to India. Procurement of Dassault Mirage 2000 fighter aircraft and a squadron of DCNS s (called s) are examples of strategic defence acquisitions. The armed-services of both nations conduct joint-exercises on an annual basis. France and India also maintain a discreet "strategic dialogue" that covers joint cooperation against terrorism. The strategic autonomy of the French Force de frappe resonates well within Indian strategic circles.

French Overseas regions of Réunion and Mayotte establish French sovereign presence in the Indian Ocean. Réunion has a significant ethnic Indian population colloquially called Malbars and which includes all Réunionnais of Indian origin. Réunion's location in the Indian Ocean makes France ideally positioned to leverage advantages of the Neighbourhood first policy and Indian Ocean outreach priorities which were announced by the government of Narendra Modi.

On 20 November 2015, a week after the attacks in Paris, French Minister Laurent Fabius visited New Delhi and met with Prime Minister Narendra Modi and Foreign Minister Sushma Swaraj. The talks centered around enhancing cooperation to fight terrorism, as well as preparations for the 2015 Climate summit in Paris. After the meeting Fabius stated that France and India were "in the same boat" with regards to terrorism saying, "I want to say that France is grateful for tremendous support it has received from the international community including Indian friends ... We have a good cooperation with our Indian friends on this. I was discussion it this morning with Prime Minister Modi. We shall develop our cooperation."

Institutional Structure for dialogue 

France and India have instituted a Strategic Dialogue at the level of National Security Advisers whose 27th round of Strategic Dialogue was held in Paris on 12–13 January 2015. The last Foreign Office Consultations at the level of Foreign Secretaries was held in Paris on 17 June 2013.

Military relation

Defense partnership and cooperation is built on historic French and Indian military interactions which stretch back to the Carnatic Wars. India was heavily involved in both World War I and World War II and suffered huge loss of lives on battlefields in France.

A 400-strong contingent of the Indian armed forces led the Bastille Day parade in 2009 for which the Prime Minister of India was the Guest of Honour – the first time ever that Indian troops took part in another country's national day parade.

Under the framework of the structured talks under the Indo-French Defence Cooperation Agreement several meetings on industrial collaboration and service exchanges are held regularly. The 3rd meeting of the JWG on Counter-terrorism was held in New Delhi on 19–20 November 2012. The 11th meeting of the Indo-French Research Forum (IFRF) was held in Paris from 17 to 19 December 2012. The 15th. High Level Committee for Defence Cooperation (HCDC) at the level of Defence Secretaries, met in Paris on 12 January 2015.

Indo-French Air Force Exercise Garuda IV was held at Istres air base in France from 14 to 25 June 2010. 
Indo-French Joint Naval Exercise Varuna was held in the Mediterranean sea off the port of Toulon from 19 to 22 July 2012. 
The first Indo-France joint army exercise named Shakti was conducted in India at Chaubattia from 9–22 October 2011. 
In 2013, Army chief General Bikram Singh visited Commandement des Forces Terrestres Land Forces Command in Lille and the French Military School at Draguignan.
In 2015, Vice Admiral SPS Cheema, FOC-in-C West was hosted by the French Navy at Toulon.
The Indo-French Joint Army exercise was held in Rajasthan, India from 19 to 21 January 2016.

Indian Prime Minister Modi stated that "We consider France one of our most reliable defense allies."

Indian and French Navies will be able to use each other's naval bases, under an agreement signed in 2018. Indian warships will be able to use French bases in Indian and southern Pacific oceans.

At the Shangri-La Dialogue in Singapore in 2018, French and British defense ministers announced they would sail warships through the South China Sea to challenge China's military expansion.

Intensified collaboration with India and the Quad

On 9 September 2020, France, India and Australia held their first India-France-Australia Trilateral Dialogue, with their foreign secretaries meeting through videoconference. They discussed geostrategic challenges, their respective strategies for a free, open and inclusive Indo-Pacific, and prospects for cooperation in the region, especially in the context of the covid public health crisis.

In February 2021, France announced that a French Rubis-class nuclear attack submarine, Emeraude, has successfully concluded a passage of the South China Sea to prove the capacity for the connection with Australian, American and Japanese strategic partners.

On 24 February, a India-France-Australia Trilateral Dialogue meeting was held, to take stock of the progress made on the outcomes of the foreign secretary level trilateral dialogue held in September 2020. This included amongst others maritime security, humanitarian aid and disaster relief, blue economy, protection of marine global commons, combatting illegal fishing, and cooperation in multilateral fora. They also discussed the next steps to be taken for furthering trilateral cooperation in the Indo-Pacific region.

On 30 March 2021, French Navy’s amphibious assault helicopter carrier Tonnerre and escort frigate Surcouf arrived at the Kochi port in Kerala, India, ahead of a joint naval exercise with the four Quad member countries. The French naval drill exercise is called La Perouse and is scheduled to take place from 5 to 7 April 2021. The 2021 edition will be the first edition with participants from all four Quad members. The two warships are on a five-month-long deployment in the Indo-Pacific.

On 13 April, a new India-France-Australia Trilateral Dialogue meeting is planned in New Delhi.

Trade & Investment

Indo-French bilateral trade has been growing though it has still not reached the €12 billion target set by both the Governments during the visit of the French President to India in January 2008. In 2011, bilateral trade had increased by 6% to €7.46 billion. In the first ten months of 2012, there has been a decrease of 3.71% in the bilateral trade overall the same period of 2011. Based on the annual data, the Indian exports of services to France have shown a growth in the last three years reaching €1.32 bn in 2011 while the imports from France fell to €0.66 bn in the same year.

Foreign Direct Investment (FDI) 
France is the 9th largest foreign investor in India with a cumulative investment of approximately US$3 billion [Investment was of the order of US$2.98 billion during the period April 2000 to June 2012, which represents 2% of total inflows]. The technical and financial collaborations approved with France number 952. Top sectors attracting FDI inflows from France are Chemicals (other than fertilisers) (18.80%), Cement and Gypsum Products (15.82%), Services Sector (financial & non-financial) (9.41%), Fuels (power & oil refinery) (6.47%) & Electrical Equipments (including computer software & electronics) (5.34%) and auto sector. There are about 800 French companies in India (subsidiaries or JVs, representative offices or branch offices with about 150,000 employees).

In 2011, India was the 13th largest foreign investor in France in terms of project numbers. Indian Investments in France have been growing and Indian companies have invested around €1 billion from April 1996 in different sectors like pharmaceuticals (Ranbaxy and Wockhardt), Software (Tata Consultancy Services, Infosys & Wipro), Wine (Kingfisher), Steel (Tata, Electrosteel), Plastics (Sintex), Railway wagons (Titagarh Wagons), Aerospace (Cades/Axis) & Autoparts (Jyoti) etc.110 Indian-owned companies, including 27 greenfield investments, are present in France and are employing over 5,600 persons.

The Indo-French CEOs Forum, formed in 2009, has been tasked to identify new avenues for cooperation and take initiatives to facilitate business links between both countries. The 16th session of the Joint Committee for Economic and Technical Cooperation, at the level of Ministers of Commerce which deals with issues related to commerce and trade, was held on 23–25 June 2010 in Paris. The fifth meeting of India France CEOs’ Forum was held in New Delhi on 22–23 November 2012.

Aerospace

Aviation
Indian companies are major clients for Airbus & ATR aircraft. Air India, IndiGo and AirAsia India host extensive fleets of Airbus passenger aircraft.

France has been a long-standing and reliable supplier of fighter planes and light utility helicopters to the Indian armed services with aircraft such as Breguet Alizé, Dassault Ouragan, Dassault Mystère IV, Sepecat Jaguar, Aerospatiale SA 315B Lama, Aérospatiale Alouette III and Dassault Mirage 2000. France also supplies Turbomeca TM 333 and jointly developed the HAL/Turbomeca Shakti helicopter engines for HAL Dhruv. DRDO 3D Multi-Function Control Radar (MFCR) was developed as part of the Indian anti-ballistic missile programme in cooperation with THALES of France. DCNS is building six Scorpène submarines of the Kalvari class, which will be armed with SM.39 Exocet anti-ship missiles, under a technology transfer agreement at Mazagon Docks in Mumbai.

Dassault Rafale won the Indian MMRCA competition to supply 126 medium multi-role combat aircraft to the Indian Air Force. In April 2015, the inabilities to conclude negotiations on contractual obligations  led the Modi government to transform the acquisition into a G2G procurement for 36 aircraft in flyaway condition to equip 3 squadrons of the Indian Air Force. Defense analysts have voiced concern that equipment procurement requirements which were defined 2 decades ago are out of sync with current requirements and the future nature of air-combat. Air forces of advanced Western nations, especially US & France, are reorganizing their air forces with increase in space-based assets and downsizing of fleets of manned combat aircraft. Autonomous drones have become the preferred platform for high-risk missions over enemy territory in both high and low intensity conflict zones. At present, NATO uses aerial reconnaissance drones to monitor the borders of Europe and US uses maritime surveillance drones in the Western Pacific and unmanned combat drones in missions against low-value and unsophisticated targets in Iraq, Afghanistan, Libya and Syria. Defense white-papers published in OECD countries show that use of combat and reconnaissance pilotless vehicles (like the flight-tested Dassault nEUROn and Northrop Grumman X-47B UAVs or the Boeing X-37 robotic spacecraft) will become widespread in the years ahead.

Space
ISRO and CNES (French National Space Agency) have an umbrella agreement, operating successfully since 1993, under which joint missions like Megha-Tropiques and SARAL have been successfully developed. ISRO has launched French SPOT satellites (Spot-6 & SPOT-7) on PSLV satellite launch vehicles.

Under a commercial Launch Service Agreement between Antrix Corporation Limited (ANTRIX), the commercial arm of ISRO and ASTRIUM SAS, a Company under EADS, France, two advanced Remote Sensing SPOT satellites were successfully launched in 2013 & 2014 on-board ISRO's Polar Satellite Launch Vehicle.

Arianespace based at France has been the major provider of launch services to Indian Geo-Stationary satellites. Subsequent to the launch of APPLE satellite, 18 Indian satellites have been launched by Arianespace. On 7 October 2016, GSAT-18 communication satellite was launched successfully on board an Ariane 5 VA-231 launcher from Kourou, French Guiana.

Civil Nuclear Energy
A landmark Framework Agreement on Civil Nuclear Cooperation was signed between India and France on 30 September 2008 during the visit of Prime Minister Dr Manmohan Singh to France. Subsequently, during the visit of President Nicolas Sarkozy to India from 4–7 December 2010, the General Framework Agreement and the Early Works Agreement between NPCIL and Areva for implementation of EPR NPP Units at Jaitapur Nuclear Power Project were signed.

Healthcare 
Several French firms (Aventis, Rhodia, Pasteur Institute) are active in the life-sciences and medicare sector.

In February 2015, William Haseltine, president of ACCESS Health International and a former professor at Harvard Medical School opined that French healthcare was the best in the world surpassing even Singapore.

Indian life insurance market is the fastest growing in the world and the seventh largest.

Education 

Indians spend 7.5% of household income on education.

Campus France India, a student recruitment initiative of the French embassy in India, is showcasing France as an education destination for Indian students. From 1 to 7 October 2015 representatives of French universities and visa officers would travel to Bangalore, Chennai, Pune and Kochi for a course opportunities and visa guidance road-show. French government is offering 5-year visas to encourage more Indian students to study in France and allowing students who have completed their studies in France an extra year to look for employment within their sector. In 2014, France hosted 3,000 Indian students many of whom were provided full-scholarships covering costs of education and allowance for boarding, lodging and air-travel. The low costs of high-quality education has made France the third most preferred destination worldwide for international students.

Education and Science & Technology

Education

The bilateral educational cooperation between India and France has grown over the last few years. France and India established a Consortrium of Indo-French Universities to increase educational cooperation. Around 300 MoUs have been signed between Indian and French universities and private institutions. The number of Indian students studying in France in various fields has increased over the years. For the academic year 2011–2012, 2550 Indian students came to France.

The framework for bilateral educational cooperation is provided by the Educational Exchange Programme (EEP), which includes mutual recognition of degrees, bolstering the research programme and increasing student-scholar research mobility through a flexible visa regime was signed in 2007 by Joint Secretary, Department of Higher Education, Ministry of Human Resource Development and Secretary, Cooperation and Culture, French Ministry of Foreign Affairs (MFA). A Joint Working Group has also been set up under the EEP. One of the most important initiatives in the field of education has been the cooperation on the new IIT in Rajasthan, following a joint declaration in 2008. A Letter of Intent (LOI) has been signed in 2012.

In pursuant to the 1956 Treaty establishing De Jure Cession of French Establishments in India, France operates two world-class scientific research laboratories in India : French Institute of Pondicherry (IFP) and the École française d'Extrême-Orient (EFEO). In December 2014, Pondicherry University hosted the inaugural Indo-French Social Sciences Winter School. Pondicherry University and French Institute of Pondicherry (IFP) are jointly conducting the 2016 Social Sciences Winter School on the theme of Mobility and Social Dynamics from 28 November to 2 December 2016. The biennial event is attended by academics from France and India who lead multidisciplinary training workshops addressing theoretical and methodological issues in social science research.

Alliance Française has an extensive network of 19 teaching-centres within India and is very popular for French-language courses and cultural programmes. French is the second most popular European language in India after English.

Scientific & Technical Cooperation

France and India view each other as important partners in space technology and applications. Indian Space Research Organisation (ISRO) and its French counterpart Centre National de Etudes Spatiales (CNES) have a history of cooperation and collaboration spanning about four decades. Scientific community of both nations cooperate in joint radiation experiment, space components development and space education. ISRO Vikas rocket engine benefited from Indo-French scientific collaboration in France on the Viking 4A engine built by CNES/SEP.

The Indo-French Centre for Promotion of Advanced Research (CEFIPRA) is the nodal framework for promoting bilateral scientific cooperation in fundamental and applied research, frontier technologies and exchange of scientists and post doctoral researchers. The office of CEFIPRA has been established in Delhi and the centre is currently funded through an annual corpus of €3 million with India and France equally contributing €1.5 million each. CEFIPRA completes 25 years in 2012. The 25th Anniversary Celebrations of CEFIPRA were formally launched in a programme organised in New Delhi on 6 March 2012. As part of the Silver Jubilee celebrations, a number of programmes have been envisaged; these include holding of seminars, organising science quiz in schools and screening of documentary films.

French authorities have provided land for extending the Maison de l‘Inde in France, which will contribute to augmenting accommodation facilities for Indian students in Paris.

Pasteur Institute in Coonoor, Tamil Nadu which opened on 6 April 1907 is one of the oldest vaccine manufacturing public sectors enterprises in India.

Collaborative efforts to preserve heritage buildings and Vedic literature in former French establishments in India has received popular appreciation among Indian populace and served to promote French technical expertise in restoration of monuments and documents. Indian heritage conservation societies rely heavily on technical assistance and documentary archives of the French Institute of Pondicherry for restoration projects.

Cultural Exchanges

Indian culture enjoys a wide and discerning audience among the French population, as is evident in the numerous and frequent cultural events organised all over France, spanning the entire gamut of Indian art, music, dance, cinema and literature. While the Indian Council for Cultural Relations (ICCR) sponsors visits of Indian artists to France as also exchange of students in the field of culture and art, there is a growing number of private impresarios who organise cultural events throughout France. A significant number of Indian artists are therefore giving performances in France regularly on a commercial basis or at the initiative of the various local cultural 
associations outside the purview of the official exchanges. The Indo-French Cultural Exchange Programme (CEP) provides the overall umbrella for the organisation of a variety of cultural programmes. The last (16th) session of the Joint Commission on Culture which reviews the CEP was held on 29 September 2009, in New Delhi.

The Institut français en Inde is active in Delhi.

Namaste France

The 15-month-long Indian cultural festival- "Namaste France" was held from 14 April 2010 to 28 June 2011. It was successful in terms of putting India on the cultural radar of France. ‘Namaste France’ was a comprehensive presentation of Indian culture including art, music, dance, fashion, tourism, films, and literature as also business and education in both its traditional and contemporary forms. 

The Namaste France Festival was organised in response to ‘Bonjour India’ a similar French cultural festival, organised by the French Embassy in India in 2009–2010. During the visit of Hon’ble Minister of Culture, Housing and Urban Poverty Alleviation, Kumari Selja to Paris to inaugurate the exhibition ‘The Last Harvest – Paintings of Tagore at the prestigious Petit Palais museum from 26 January to 11 March 2012, a Declaration of Intent was signed with her French counterpart for further reinforcing cultural cooperation on 26 January 2012. On the same day, a MOU was signed between the Ministry of Culture of India and the Louvre Museum with the aim of establishing an active partnership in the area of exchange of competencies and expertise, particularly in the field of museology, temporary exhibitions and other cultural events.

The 2012 Cannes Film Festival was important for India. For the first time, four Indian films were selected for screening in different categories of the festival namely Miss Lovely, Kalpana, Peddlers and Gangs of Wasseypur. India is going to celebrate 100 years of Indian cinema in 2013. The Cannes Festival (15–26 May 2013), the Vesoul International Film Festival of Asian Cinema (Festival international des cinémas d'Asie) from 5–12 February 2013, and the 35th International Short Film Festival of Clermont-Ferrand (1–9 February 2013) have confirmed India as a ‘Country of Honour’ in 2013 to celebrate the Centenary of the Indian Film Industry.

Bonjour India
In 1985 Indian performers were cheered at the Trocadero Alley in Paris, and in 1989 French artists enchanted audiences at Marine Drive in Mumbai. Two decades later, Bonjour India came back with a bang in 2009, and by 2013 it grew into more and more collaborations.
Scaling up in its third edition, Bonjour India 2017–18 is a four-month-long mega voyage across India that will celebrate Indo-French partnership as well as shape the next decade of human exchange between the two countries. From November 2017 to February 2018, Bonjour India covers around a 100 programmes and projects in over 30 cities across 20 states & union territories. Bonjour India provides a platform for enduring partnerships highlighting Indo-French innovation and creativity across the themes of Smart Citizen, High Mobility, Go Green.

Diaspora

Indian Community in France
According to statistics published by the Indian Embassy in Paris, the Indian community including NRIs in France is estimated to be around 106,000, largely originating from Puducherry, Karaikal, Yanam, Mahe and Chandranagar. There are large communities of PIOs in overseas territories/departments of France: Reunion Island (about 250,000), Guadeloupe (about 57,000), Martinique (about 6,000) and St. Martin (about 300).

Indians living in France have access to French social security protection and services through an agreement concluded in 2008.

French Community in India

The French in India are predominantly the remnants of the French presence in India, which began in 1673 with the establishment of French India and continued until 1962 when the French territory was formally transferred to India. The French presence was minor compared to the British and was generally ignored.

There were 12,864 French nationals residing in India in 1988. Nearly all are in the Union Territory of Puducherry in south-eastern India (11,726 individuals in 1988), with much smaller numbers in Karaikal (695 individuals), Mahé (50), Yanam (46), and 342 elsewhere in India.

Economic migration from France has resulted in the rise of skilled French expatriates in the urban population centres of Bangalore, Chennai, Hyderabad, Pune, Mumbai and New Delhi.

The French government had undertaken steps to strengthen Franco-Indian institutional and people-to-people ties.

Franco-Pondichérien
Franco-Pondichérien or simply Pondichérien is a term given to French citizens of Indian or mixed Creole ethnicity who continue to reside in Puducherry and who can trace their nationality to the French colonial period. Franco-Pondichériens constitute less than 2 percent of the present population of Puducherry and whose presence can be termed as ranging from 'ignored' to 'tolerated'. Franco-Pondichériens are socially regarded as foreigners in India. In France, Franco-Pondichériens face racial profiling and discrimination, due to their South Asian or mixed-race ethnicity and are perceived either as second-class citizens or economic immigrants.

Franco-Pondichériens are customarily allowed access to Indian schools and universities on par with Non-Resident Indians (NRI). India's tourism boom has turned Pondicherry into a popular travel destination and slowed the population decline of Franco-Pondichériens who find more business and work opportunities locally than having to repatriate to Europe.

Indian Citizenship Act of the Constitution of India forbids dual nationality. It is illegal to concurrently possess an Indian passport and foreign nationality and/or passport. Foreigners who possess Overseas Citizenship of India (OCI) continue to benefit consular protection from their country of nationality. Franco-Pondichériens who have served in the French armed services are disqualified from OCI: "foreign military personnel either in service or retired are not entitled for grant of OCI". Whereas OCI eligibility regarding conscripts who have undergone the mandatory military service or Journée défense et citoyenneté is unclear, Franco-Pondichériens enjoy treaty rights to visit India as guaranteed through Article IX of the 1956 Treaty establishing De Jure Cession of French Establishments in India: "French civil servants, magistrates and military personnel born in the Establishments or keeping there family links shall be permitted to return freely to the Establishments on leave or on retirement."

In February 2015, Indo French Senior Citizens Association staged street-protests in Pondicherry to protest against denial of the French nationality and voting rights derived from the 1956 Treaty establishing De Jure Cession of French Establishments in India. The 1956 treaty binds the Government of France to recognize French citizenship for individuals whose birth and nativity certificate had been registered during the French India regime.

In June 2015, locally employed contractual staff at the French Consulate in Pondicherry stopped work to protest against wage discrimination.

Perceptions
Social studies conducted by French researchers are prone to emphasise on the lacunae of India's economy rather than achievements and improvements in the sphere of poverty reduction, health-care, education, etc. French media portray India in an unfavourable light by focussing principally on events connected to crimes, corruption, inequalities, poverty, ethnic & religious strife, etc.

The morbid fascination of European tourists with Hindu cremation rituals is perceived as lack of sensitivity besides being a gross invasion of privacy. Hoards of tourists flock to cremation grounds on the banks of the Ganges, especially in Varanasi (Bénarès), to photograph funeral pyres.

BBC World Service Country Rating Poll Data for France & India
According to a 2014 BBC World Service Poll, 35% of Indians view France's influence positively, 40% neutral and 25% expressing a negative view, while 61% of the French view India's influence positively, 11% neutral and 28% expressing a negative view.

See also
 Foreign relations of France
 Foreign relations of India
 Indian diaspora in France
 French people in India
 Institut français en Inde
 French Institute of Pondicherry
 India–European Union relations

References

Further reading
 Agmon, Danna. "The Currency of Kinship: Trading Families and Trading on Family in Colonial French India." Eighteenth-Century Studies (2014): 137-155 online.
 Agmon, Danna. A Colonial Affair: Commerce, Conversion, and Scandal in French India ((Cornell University Press, 2017) 
 Bayly, Susan. “Imagining ‘Greater India’: French and Indian Visions of Colonialism in the Indic Mode.” Modern Asian Studies 38#3, (2004), pp. 703–44, .
 Beasley, Faith E. Versailles Meets the Taj Mahal: François Bernier, Marguerite de la Sablière and Enlightening Conversations in Seventeenth-Century France (U of Toronto Press, 2018).
 Chester, Lucy P. “The Mapping of Empire: French and British Cartographies of India in the Late-Eighteenth Century.” Portuguese Studies, vol. 16, (2000), pp. 256–75, .
 Das, Aditya, ed. Defending British India Against Napoleon: The Foreign Policy of Governor-General Lord Minto, 1807-13 (Boydell & Brewer, 2016).
 Das, Sonia N. "Failed legacies of colonial linguistics: lessons from Tamil books in French India and French Guiana." Comparative Studies in Society and History 59.4 (2017): 846-883 online.
 de Vos, F. H. “FRANCOIS CARON AND THE FRENCH EAST INDIA COMPANY.” The Journal of the Ceylon Branch of the Royal Asiatic Society of Great Britain & Ireland 18#55, (1904), pp. 313–20, .
 Dibadj, Reza. "Compagnie des Indes: governance and bailout." in Origins of shareholder advocacy (Palgrave Macmillan, New York, 2011) pp. 169-186.
 Goswami, Niranjan, ed. Desiring India: Representations through British and French Eyes 1584-1857. (Jadavpur University Press, 2020) online.
 Hammerbeck, David. French Theatre, Orientalism, and the Representation of India, 1770-1865: India Lost and Regained (Routledge, 2022).
 Huttenback, Robert A. "The French Threat to India and British Relations with Sind, 1799-1809." English Historical Review 76.301 (1961): 590-599. .
 Jørgensen, Helle. "Between marginality and universality: present tensions and paradoxes in French colonial cultural heritage, civilizing mission, and citizenship in Puducherry, India." Heritage & Society 10.1 (2017): 45-67.
 Kennedy, B. E. "Anglo-French Rivalry in Southeast Asia 1763–93: Some Repercussions." Journal of Southeast Asian Studies 4.2 (1973): 199-215.
 Krishnamurthy, B. “SOME ASPECTS OF THE FRENCH TRADE WITH INDIA (1664-1771).” Proceedings of the Indian History Congress, vol. 40, (1979), pp. 962–72, .
 McLynn, Frank. 1759: the year Britain became master of the world (Random House, 2011).
 Malleson, G. B. History Of The French In India (1909) online
 Manning, Catherine. Fortunes à faire: the French in Asian trade, 1719–48 (Routledge, 2017).
 Margerison, Kenneth. “Commercial Liberty, French National Power, and the Indies Trade After the Seven Years’ War.” Historical Reflections / Réflexions Historique 35#3 (2009), pp. 52–73, .
 Margerison, Kenneth. "French Visions of Empire: Contesting British Power in India after the Seven Years War." English Historical Review 130#544, (2015), pp. 583–612, .
 Margerison, Kenneth. "Rogue diplomacy: Sartine, Saint-Lubin and the French attempt to recover ‘Lost India’, 1776–80." French History 30.4 (2016): 477-504.
 Marsh, Kate. India in the French Imagination: Peripheral Voices, 1754-1815 (2009) excerpt; also online review.
 Mielly, Michelle, et al. "A passage to France: skilled Indian SIEs in transition." in Critical perspectives on international business (2017); migration in 21st century; online
 Miles, William F. S. "Citizens without soil: the French of India (Pondicherry)." Ethnic and racial studies 13.2 (1990): 250-273.
 Miles, William F. S. "Defective decolonization: The Pondichery legacy." Proceedings of the Meeting of the French Colonial Historical Society Vol. 16. (1992) .
 Mole, Gregory. "Incriminating empire: Treason, patriotism, and the fall of French India." French Historical Studies 44.1 (2021): 27-57.
 Mole, Gregory T. "Mahé and the Politics of Empire: Trade, Conquest, and Revolution on the Malabar Coast." in La Révolution française. Cahiers de l’Institut d’histoire de la Révolution française 8 (2015) online.
 Namakkal, Jessica. Unsettling Utopia: The Making and Unmaking of French India (Columbia UP, 2021).
 Raina, Dhruv. "The French Jesuit Manuscripts on Indian Astronomy: The Narratology and Mystery Surrounding a Late Seventeenth–Early Eighteenth Century Project." in Looking at it from Asia: the Processes that Shaped the Sources of History of Science (Springer, Dordrecht, 2010) pp. 115-140.
 Rapson, E. J. The struggle between England and France for supremacy in India (1887) online
 Ray, Aniruddha. "Establishment of the French Factory at Patna." Proceedings of the Indian History Congress. Vol. 61.  2000. .
 Ray, Indrani. “INDIA IN ASIAN TRADE IN THE 1730s—AN 18TH CENTURY FRENCH MEMOIR.” Proceedings of the Indian History Congress, vol. 34, (1973), pp. 271–90, .
 Rothrock, George A. “Seventeenth-Century India through French Eyes.” Historian 22#2 (1960), pp. 163–84, .
 Ruggiu, François-Joseph. "India and the reshaping of the French colonial policy (1759-1789)." Itinerario 35.2 (2011): 25-43.
 Sen, S.P. The French in India, 1763-1816 (1971)
 
 Smith, Blake. "Starch wars: Rice, bread and South Asian difference in the French Enlightenment." French Cultural Studies 26.2 (2015): 130-139.
 Sridharan, M. P. "Tipu's Letters to French Officials." Proceedings of the Indian History Congress Vol. 45. (1984) 
 Wallerstein, Immanuel. "Incorporation of Indian subcontinent into capitalist world-economy." Economic and Political Weekly (1986): PE28-PE39. .

Historiography
 Bissoondoyal, B. "India as Seen by French Travellers." Indo-Asian Culture (1962) 19#4 pp 434-443.
 Cameron, Roderick. "The Abbe Dubois"  History Today (1958) 8#3 pp 164-169. About the priest in India 1792 to 1832 whose book Hindu Manners, Customs and Ceremonies was influential in Europe.
 Filliozat, Jean. France and indology (Ramakrishna Mission Institute of Culture, 1955).
 Filliozat, Jean. "France and indology"  Indo-Asian Culture (1956) 5#3 pp 296-313.
 Marsh, Kate. Narratives of the French Empire: Fiction, nostalgia, and imperial rivalries, 1784 to the present (Lexington Books, 2013).
 Mohan, Jyoti. Claiming India: French Scholars and the Preoccupation with India in the Nineteenth Century (SAGE Publishing India, 2017) online dissertation version

In French
David-Néel, Alexandra (2002). L' Inde où j'ai vécu: Avant et après l'indépendance. Paris: Plon.
Elfi, Nicole (2008). Aux sources de l'Inde: L'initiation à la connaissance. Paris: Les Belles Lettres. 
Gautier, François (2005). La caravane intérieure: Récit. Paris: Les Belles lettres.
Gautier, François (2008) Les Français en Inde – Pondichéry, Chandernagor, Mahé, Yanaon, Karikal. France Loisirs.

External links

 Indian Ministry for External Affairs
 Indian Embassy in France
 Permanent Delegation of India to UNESCO
 French Ministry of Foreign Affairs
 French Embassy in India
 Pondicherry from the origins to 1824 French Institute of Pondicherry
 1956 Treaty establishing De Jure Cession of French Establishments in India
 Indo-French partnership on Kaziranga project

 
India
Bilateral relations of India
Relations of colonizer and former colony